Robert C. Wright (November 5, 1944 – February 22, 2014) was an American politician from Pennsylvania.  He served as a Republican member of the Pennsylvania House of Representatives, 159th district from 1981 to 1992 and as a judge on the Delaware County Court of Common Pleas from 1992 to 2008.

Early life and education
Wright was born in Chester, Pennsylvania to Mary Maloney Wright and the Honorable Robert A. Wright.  He graduated from Chester High School in 1962.

Wright graduated with a Bachelor of Arts degree from George Washington University in 1966 and received his law degree from Villanova University School of Law in 1969.

Career
From 1970 to 1991, Wright worked as an attorney in his father's practice and was a director on several boards including the Chester Water Authority and the Chester Boys and Girls Club.  He also served as the Solicitor for the Chester Housing Authority and President of the Delaware County Republican Council.

Pennsylvania House of Representatives
Wright was elected to the Pennsylvania House of Representatives, 159th district on September 15, 1981 in a special election to serve the remainder of the 1981 term after Arthur Earley died of a heart attack.  He served five consecutive terms and resigned from the House on January 5, 1992.

Delaware County Court of Common Pleas
Wright was elected to the Delaware County Court of Common Pleas in 1992 and served until he retired in 2008. Wright and his father Robert A. Wright were the first father and son to serve on that court at the same time.

In 2014, Wright died at age 69 of complications of amyotrophic lateral sclerosis. He also believed he had chronic Lyme disease, a condition not recognized by medical science. He is interred at Haven Memorial Cemetery in Chester, Pennsylvania.

Personal life
Wright was married to Florence Wright and they had two children together.  He was a member of the Tau Epsilon Phi fraternity at George Washington University.

References

1944 births
2014 deaths
20th-century American politicians
African-American judges
African-American state legislators in Pennsylvania
Chester High School alumni
Neurological disease deaths in Pennsylvania
Deaths from motor neuron disease
George Washington University alumni
Judges of the Pennsylvania Courts of Common Pleas
Republican Party members of the Pennsylvania House of Representatives
People from Chester, Pennsylvania
Villanova University School of Law alumni